Luís Pedro Gomes Martins (born 23 June 1989), known as Luís Pedro, is a Portuguese footballer who plays for Anadia F.C. as a central defender.

He spent his entire professional career in LigaPro, making over 350 appearances mainly in two spells with Freamunde, and also with Portimonense, Penafiel and Varzim.

Club career
Born in Freamunde, Porto District, Luís Pedro started his career with local S.C. Freamunde. He spent six seasons with the club in the second division, making his debut in the competition on 4 May 2008 in 2–4 home loss against C.D. Aves (21 minutes played).

In the summer of 2013, Luís Pedro was due to sign for C.D. Nacional of the Primeira Liga. His contract was terminated shortly after being told by manager Manuel Machado he was not part of his plans, and he stayed in the second level by joining Portimonense S.C. on a one-year deal. He played 13 total games in his time on the Algarve, and scored to open a 1–1 home draw with C.D. Feirense on 29 December to keep his team in first place.

Luís Pedro went back to his hometown club in June 2014, on a one-year contract. He was an undisputed started during his second spell, then moved to F.C. Penafiel for the next two years.

After becoming a free agent in June 2019, the 30-year-old Luís Pedro switched to Varzim S.C. again in the second tier for the upcoming season. In late October, he was reported to be the active player with most overall appearances in the competition ahead of Jorge Pires.

International career
Luís Pedro scored once in his only appearance for the Portuguese under-21 side, a 2–0 victory over Mozambique on 14 July 2009 for the Lusophony Games held in Amadora.

References

External links

1989 births
Living people
People from Paços de Ferreira
Sportspeople from Porto District
Portuguese footballers
Association football defenders
Liga Portugal 2 players
Campeonato de Portugal (league) players
S.C. Freamunde players
Portimonense S.C. players
F.C. Penafiel players
Varzim S.C. players
Vitória F.C. players
Anadia F.C. players
Portugal under-21 international footballers